The Escondido Valley AVA is an American Viticultural Area located in Pecos County, Texas. There are no wineries located in the Escondido Valley AVA. The largest winery making Escondido Valley AVA designated wines was Ste. Genevieve Wines, whose winery facilities were located near Fort Stockton. Mesa Vineyards, owners of the Ste. Genevieve Winery, filed for bankruptcy in January 2022.

References

American Viticultural Areas
Geography of Texas
Geography of Pecos County, Texas
Texas wine
1992 establishments in Texas